Forest-South railway station is a railway station in the municipality of Forest in Brussels, Belgium. The station is located on the Belgian railway line 96 between the Brussels-South and Ruisbroek railway stations. It was opened in 1862

Train services
The station is served by the following service(s):

Brussels RER services (S2) Leuven - Brussels - Halle - Braine-le-Comte

References

External links
 

Forest, Belgium
Railway stations in Brussels
Railway stations opened in 1862